Domrud or Dom Rud may refer to:

Domrud-e Olya
Domrud-e Sofla
Domrud-e Amir (disambiguation)